Hoiles is a surname. Notable people with the surname include:

Chris Hoiles (born 1965), American baseball player
John Hoiles (disambiguation), multiple people
Stephen Hoiles (born 1981), Australian rugby union footballer
Raymond C. Hoiles (1878–1970), American newspaper owner